Richard Anthony "Ric" Keller (born September 5, 1964) is an American politician, author, and lawyer who served as the U.S. representative for Florida's 8th congressional district from 2001 to 2009. His district included much of the Central Florida region including the Greater Orlando metropolitan area. He chaired the House Higher Education subcommittee and served on the Judiciary and Education committees. Today he is an author, speaker, TV commentator and attorney.

Personal information
Keller was born in Johnson City, Tennessee. He received a bachelor's degree from East Tennessee State University, where he graduated first in his class in 1986, and a J.D. degree from Vanderbilt University in 1992. He was a lawyer in Florida before being elected to the House of Representatives in 2000.

Keller served eight years in the U.S. House of Representatives. He chaired the House Higher Education subcommittee served on the Judiciary and Education committees. Keller is now a partner at law firm of Hill, Rugh, Keller & Main, P.L. in Orlando, Fla.  He lives in Winter Park, Florida with his wife, Lori, and their blended family.

Committee assignments
Education and the Workforce Committee (now "Education and Labor")
Subcommittee on Early Childhood, Elementary and Secondary Education
Subcommittee on Higher Education, Lifelong Learning, and Competitiveness (Chairman and Ranking Member)
Judiciary Committee
Subcommittee on Courts, the Internet, and Intellectual Property
Subcommittee on Commercial and Administrative Law
Antitrust Task Force and Competition Policy

Congressional campaigns

2000

In Keller's first run for Congress, he finished in second place in the Republican primary with 31% of the vote, against fellow Republican Bill Sublette, who had 43%, but defeated Sublette in the runoff election, getting 52% of that vote.

In the 2000 general election, Keller won with 51% of the vote against Democrat Linda Chapin.

2002
Keller readily won the 2002 Congressional election against Democrat Eddie Diaz, winning with 65% of the vote.

2004
In 2004 Keller won his third term with 60% of the vote against Democratic challenger Stephen Murray.

2006

In 2006, Keller won the Republican primary with 72% of the vote, defeating businesswoman Elizabeth Doran. In the general election, Keller defeated Democrat Charlie Stuart, 53% to 46%.

2008

In 2008, Keller won the Republican primary defeating attorney Todd Long 53% to 47%, but lost the general election 48% to 52% to Democrat Alan Grayson when the GOP presidential nominee John McCain lost the district 47% to 52% to Democrat Barack Obama.

References

External links
 
 

1964 births
Living people
Methodists from Florida
East Tennessee State University alumni
People from Orlando, Florida
Republican Party members of the United States House of Representatives from Florida
21st-century American politicians